Hilary and Jackie is a 1998 British biographical film directed by Anand Tucker, starring Emily Watson and Rachel Griffiths as the British classical musician sisters Jacqueline du Pré (cello) and Hilary du Pré (flute). The film covers Jacqueline's meteoric rise to fame, her alleged affair with Hilary's husband Christopher Finzi, and her struggle with multiple sclerosis starting in her late 20s ultimately leading to her death at the age of 42.

The screenplay by Frank Cottrell-Boyce claimed in the end credits to have been based on the 1997 memoir A Genius in the Family by Piers and Hilary du Pré (later republished under the title Hilary and Jackie). However, that memoir had not yet been published when Hilary and Jackie was being filmed. Cottrell-Boyce stated, "Hilary was working on the book at the same time as I was working on the film ... it was at a very early stage when we were doing the script". The film was instead based on conversations with Hilary and Piers; unlike the book it does not claim to be the true story, and contains some fictionalised incidents.

The film attracted controversy and criticism for allegedly distorting details in Jacqueline's life, and several personal friends of Jacqueline du Pré publicly condemned the film. Hilary du Pré publicly defended her version of the story.

Hilary and Jackie generally received critical acclaim, and both Griffiths and Watson were nominated for an Academy Award, for Best Supporting Actress and Best Actress, respectively.

Plot
In 1960s London, sisters Hilary and Jacqueline "Jackie" du Pré both pursue musical professions after being instructed throughout their childhoods in music by their mother; the flute for Hilary, and the cello for Jackie. Though Jackie rebelled against practising as a child, she became a virtuoso in early adulthood, quickly rising to international prominence.

While Jackie tours throughout Europe, Hilary remains in London with her parents and brother, Piers, and struggles in her musical studies at the Royal Academy of Music. She becomes acquainted with a gregarious fellow student, Christopher "Kiffer" Finzi, son of composer Gerald Finzi, and the two begin a romantic relationship. Hilary begins playing in a community orchestra, where she garners local fame. Jackie returns home from touring in Moscow, and pleads with Hilary to share a flat with her. Instead, Hilary marries Kiffer, and the two relocate to a farmhouse in the country to start a family. Meanwhile, Jackie begins dating pianist and conductor Daniel Barenboim, with whom she bonds over their mutual love of music. Her eventual conversion to Judaism and subsequent marriage to Daniel garners significant publicity.

Later, Jackie arrives unannounced at Hilary and Kiffer's home, inexplicably forgoing scheduled engagements she has in Los Angeles. She confides to Hilary that she wants to have sex with Kiffer, and makes attempts to seduce him. The next day, Hilary finds Jackie stripped naked in the woods in the midst of an emotional breakdown. Daniel arrives and attempts to console her, but she is indifferent to him. Jackie remains at Hilary's home, and Hilary consents to Jackie having a sexual encounter with Kiffer, hoping it will help her work through her nervous breakdown. This, however, ultimately drives a rift between the sisters as the affair becomes emotionally suffused. Jackie leaves and resumes touring, but yearns for a different life.

From Jackie's perspective, Hilary chose a life with Kiffer over their relationship. While Jackie found solace in her marriage to Daniel, she began to notice a subtle yet progressive deterioration of her motor skills and hand-eye coordination. It had in fact been unspoken anxieties over her health that led to her previous visit to Hilary's.

During a live performance, Jackie finds herself unable to stand, and has to be carried offstage by Daniel. She is diagnosed with multiple sclerosis, and Hilary goes to visit her in hospital. Jackie remains optimistic about her diagnosis, but the disease progresses rapidly, leaving her unable to position her fingers or use a bow. Daniel continues to conduct around the world, and Jackie finds he is having an affair. As her disease progresses, she becomes paralysed before becoming deaf and mute. One night, Hilary goes to visit Jackiewho is in the throes of tremorsand recounts a cherished childhood memory of the two playing on the beach. Shortly after, Hilary hears news of Jackie's death on the radio. The film ends with Jackie's spirit standing on the beach where she used to play as a child, watching herself and her sister frolicking on the sand as little girls.

Cast

Production
Scenes were filmed in the Blue Coat School, the County Sessions House, George's Dock, St. George's Hall, and the Walker Art Gallery in Liverpool. Additional scenes were filmed at the Royal Academy of Music and Wigmore Hall in London, and most interiors were shot at Shepperton Studios in Surrey. Brithdir Mawr, an ancient house in north Wales, was used for location shots of Hilary's house.

Classical pieces performed in the film include compositions by Edward Elgar, Joseph Haydn, Johann Sebastian Bach, Johannes Brahms, César Franck, Matthias Georg Monn, Georg Friedrich Händel, Robert Schumann, Ludwig van Beethoven, and Antonín Dvořák. Jacqueline du Pré's cello in the movie was played and synchronised to Emily Watson's movements by Caroline Dale.

Release

Box office
Hilary and Jackie was released theatrically in the United Kingdom on 22 January 1999. In the United States, it premiered on 30 December 1998 in a limited release. In the United States, the film grossed US$4,912,892 at the box office.

Critical response

In his review in The New York Times, Stephen Holden called the film "one of the most insightful and wrenching portraits of the joys and tribulations of being a classical musician ever filmed" and "an astoundingly rich and subtle exploration of sibling rivalry and the volcanic collisions of love and resentment, competitiveness and mutual dependence that determine their lives." He went on to say "Hilary and Jackie is as beautifully acted as it is directed, edited and written."

Roger Ebert of the Chicago Sun-Times described it as "an extraordinary film [that] makes no attempt to soften the material or make it comforting through the cliches of melodrama."

In the San Francisco Chronicle, Edward Guthmann stated, "Watson is riveting and heartbreaking. Assisted by Tucker's elegant direction and Boyce's thoughtful, scrupulous writing, she gives a knockout performance."

Anthony Lane of The New Yorker said, "The sense of period, of ungainly English pride, is funny and acute, but the movie mislays its sense of wit as the girls grow up. The nub of the tale... feels both overblown and oddly beside the point; it certainly means that Tucker takes his eye, or his ear, off the music. The whole picture, indeed, is more likely to gratify the emotionally prurient than to appease lovers of Beethoven and Elgar."

Entertainment Weekly rated the film A− and added, "This unusual, unabashedly voluptuous biographical drama, a bravura feature debut for British TV director Anand Tucker, soars on two virtuoso performances: by the rightfully celebrated Emily Watson . . . and by the under-celebrated Rachel Griffiths."

Rana Dasgupta wrote in an essay about biographical films that "the film's tagline – 'The true story of two sisters who shared a passion, a madness and a man' – is a good indication of its prurient intent. The book's moving account of love and solidarity, whose characters are incomplete and complex but not "mad", is rejected in favour of a salacious account of social deviance."

Controversy
Although the film was a critical success, and received two Academy Award nominations, it ignited a furore, especially in London, centre of du Pre's performing life. A group of her closest colleagues, including fellow cellists Mstislav Rostropovich and Julian Lloyd Webber, sent a "bristling" letter to The Times in February 1999. Webber noted in an article published in The Telegraph:

Clare Finzi, Hilary du Pré's daughter, charged that the film was a "gross misinterpretation, which I cannot let go unchallenged." Daniel Barenboim said, "Couldn't they have waited until I was dead?" Additionally, a friend of Jacqueline du Pré's, guitarist John Williams, in an interview for The Observer, called the film "macabre" and "sick", adding: "My friend Jackie has been betrayed".

Hilary du Pré wrote in The Guardian, "At first I could not understand why people didn't believe my story because I had set out to tell the whole truth. When you tell someone the truth about your family, you don't expect them to turn around and say that it's bunkum. But I knew that Jackie would have respected what I had done. If I had gone for half-measures, she would have torn it up. She would have wanted the complete story to be told." Jay Fielden reported in The New Yorker that she'd said, "When you love someone, you love the whole of them. Those who are against the film want to look only at the pieces of Jackie's life that they accept. I don’t think the film has taken any liberties at all. Jackie would have absolutely loved it."

Awards and nominations

References

External links
 
 

1990s biographical films
1998 directorial debut films
1998 films
Biographical films about musicians
British biographical films
British nonlinear narrative films
Cultural depictions of British women
Cultural depictions of classical musicians
Films about classical music and musicians
Films about multiple sclerosis
Films about sisters
Films based on biographies
Films directed by Anand Tucker
Films with screenplays by Frank Cottrell-Boyce
1990s English-language films
1990s British films